Tayssir Akla (c. 1939 – 2016) was a Syrian-born, Algerian-based composer.

Early life
Tayssir Akla was born in Syria circa 1939.  He emigrated to Algeria in 1962.

Career
Akla conducted the orchestra of the Algerian Radio in 1970. He composed songs about the Algerian War, including Ana el Djazair and Thawrat al ahrar, performed by Saliha Essaghira.

Personal life and death
Akla married Nadia Kerbache, an Algerian singer of Syrian descent. He became a widow when she died in 2010. Akla died six years later, on November 22, 2016, in Brussels, Belgium. Upon his death, Azzedine Mihoubi, the Algerian Minister of Culture, called him a "big composer adopted by Algeria".

References

1930s births
2016 deaths
Syrian expatriates in Algeria
Syrian composers
Year of birth missing